Htay Kywe (7 July 1951 – 2 May 2020) was a Burmese politician who served as an Amyotha Hluttaw member of parliament for the Yangon Region No. 1 constituency. He was a member of the National League for Democracy.

Early life and education 
Htay Kywe was born on 7 July 1951 in Yangon, Myanmar. He graduated with a M.B.B.S from the University of Medicine 1, Yangon.

Political career
Htay Kywe was elected as an Amyotha Hluttaw MP, winning a majority of the 27,030 votes from the Yangon Region No. 1 parliamentary constituency.

References 

1951 births
2020 deaths
National League for Democracy politicians
University of Medicine 1, Yangon alumni
People from Yangon